The Arizona Sting are a lacrosse team based in Arizona playing in the National Lacrosse League (NLL). The 2005 season was the 5th in franchise history and 2nd as the Sting (formerly the Columbus Landsharks).

The Sting finished 2nd in the West division with a 9-7 record, and hosted the Colorado Mammoth in the opening round of the playoffs. Arizona defeated Colorado 16-13 to advance to the Western division final against the defending champion Calgary Roughnecks. The Sting defeated Calgary 19-15 in Calgary, advancing to the Championship game in only their second year in Arizona. The Sting faced the Toronto Rock in Toronto for the Championship, and with an NLL record crowd of over 19,400 fans, the Rock defeated the Sting 19-13 to win their fifth championship in seven years.

Regular season

Conference standings

Game log
Reference:

Playoffs

Game log
Reference:

Player stats
Reference:

Runners (Top 10)

Note: GP = Games played; G = Goals; A = Assists; Pts = Points; LB = Loose Balls; PIM = Penalty minutes

Goaltenders
Note: GP = Games played; MIN = Minutes; W = Wins; L = Losses; GA = Goals against; Sv% = Save percentage; GAA = Goals against average

Awards

Transactions

Trades

Roster
Reference:

See also
2005 NLL season

References

Arizona
Arizona Sting